Michael John Harney is an American actor of film, television, and theater. He is best known for starring on the Netflix original series Orange Is the New Black as Corrections Officer Sam Healy. In 2019, he had a recurring role in the Apple TV+ series For All Mankind.

Early life
Born in New York City, Harney went on to study under acting teachers William Esper and Phil Gushee, both of whom studied and taught with Sanford Meisner for many years at The Neighborhood Playhouse School Of The Theater. After studying acting for 7 years he went on to run The Michael Harney Acting Studio in New York City for 8 years. During his time in New York City, Harney acted in and/or directed more than 80 plays and one acts and starred in On The Waterfront on Broadway playing the role of Charlie Malloy.

Career
Throughout Harney's television career, he has performed in numerous blockbuster films such as Erin Brockovich and Ocean's Thirteen. Before starring on Orange Is the New Black, Harney starred as Detective Mike Roberts in the award-winning television police drama NYPD Blue and also in the HBO historical drama series Deadwood as Steve Fields. Harney first worked with Orange Is The New Black creator Jenji Kohan on the Showtime original dark comedy Weeds, starring opposite Mary-Louise Parker as Detective Mitch Ouellette.

In 2015, Harney returned to his film roots in the independent drama, Bad Hurt, which had its world premiere at the 2015 Tribeca Film Festival. Set in 1999, Bad Hurt chronicles Ed Kendall's (Harney) struggle with PTSD as a proud war veteran and father to son (Theo Rossi) and mentally ill adult daughter (Iris Gilad), and the challenges each of them face during the constant pursuit of maintaining a normal family dynamic.

Personal life
He has one son.

Filmography

Film

Television

Video games

References

External links

Interview in Queens Tribune, July, 2015

20th-century American male actors
21st-century American male actors
Living people
Male actors from New York City
American male film actors
American male stage actors
American male television actors
People from the Bronx
1956 births